Ralph Lane Polk (1849–1923) was an American compiler of facts and publisher of directories. Born in Bellefontaine, Ohio, Polk was educated at the Pennington School, New Jersey. He became a successful Detroit publisher and president of R.L. Polk & Co. He belonged to the Association of North American Directory Publishers. His son, Ralph Lane Polk Jr. (born 1911), was a later president of the company which was acquired by IHS Inc. on July 15, 2013.

References

1849 births
1923 deaths
Businesspeople from Detroit
The Pennington School alumni
People from Bellefontaine, Ohio
19th-century American businesspeople